Al-Arroub is a Palestinian refugee camp located in the southern West Bank along the Hebron-Jerusalem road, in the Hebron Governorate of the State of Palestine. Al-Arroub is 15 kilometers south of Bethlehem, with a total land area of 240 dunums. 

Since the Six-Day War in 1967, the camp has been under Israeli occupation. The population in the 1967 census conducted by the Israeli authorities was 3,647.

According to the UNRWA, in 2005, it had a population of 9,859 registered refugees. According to the Palestinian Central Bureau of Statistics (PCBS), the camp's population is 10,487 in 2016. 

In 2002, two schools were built in the camp: the Arroup Secondary School for boys, and another school for girls.

Incidents
On 11 November  2019, Omar Badawi (22) was shot dead by Israeli troops in a nearby alley as he stepped out of his house with a towel to dowse a small fire nearby set off by a Molotov cocktail thrown by youths in the direction of the soldiers who had entered the camp. A video filmed the event. An IDF investigation as of November 2021 has yet to come to a conclusion.

References

External links
 Welcome To al-'Arrub Refugee Camp
Al 'Arrub Refugee Camp (Fact Sheet),   Applied Research Institute–Jerusalem (ARIJ)
Al 'Arrub Refugee Camp Profile, ARIJ
Al 'Arrub Refugee Camp aerial photo, ARIJ
The priorities and needs for development in Al 'Arrub camp based on the community and local authorities’ assessment, ARIJ
 Arroub refugee camp, UNWRA

Populated places established in 1950
Hebron Governorate
Palestinian refugee camps in the West Bank